For other people with the same or similar name, see Abdul Majid

Abdul Majid (Urdu):(عبد الماجد) is a Pakistani astrophysicist and scientist in the field of space technology. He is a former chairman of Space and Upper Atmosphere Research Commission from 1997 to 2001. He had made significant contributions to Pakistan's space program. During his tenure as SUPARCO Administrator, Pakistan launched its two Low Earth orbit (LEO) satellites, which were masterminded and developed by him. He also initiated a satellite launch vehicle (SLV) project at SUPARCO. He retired from SUPARCO in 2001 as a chief scientist. Since his retirement, he has been inactive from Pakistan's space program and currently resides in Karachi where he lives a very quiet life there.

Education
Abdul Majid was born in Narowal, Pakistan from where he received his elementary and high school education. He received BSc (hons) and MSc in Nuclear Physics from Government College, Punjab University in 1962 and was awarded the Roll of Honours. His thesis on 'Radiative Capture of Neutrons' was rated as one of the best ever submitted for a master's degree by Rafi M. Chaudhary. Under NASA fellowship program he studied Astrogeophysics at Colorado University, Boulder, Colorado. For his PhD he worked on Radio interferometric detection of Gravity Waves under Sir Granville Jones/PJSWilliams at the University of Wales, Aberystwyth UK.  The project involved fabrication of phase switched receivers as an integral constituent of widely spaced radio interferometers. The system detected gravity waves as travelling ionospheric disturbances.

SUPARCO career
After his PhD, he came back to Pakistan and joined Pakistan's Space Program as a researcher in astrophysics and aeronautical labs. Majid worked under the supervision of noted Pakistani-Polish military scientist and aeronautical engineer, Air Commodore W. J. M. Turowicz, in the field of Rocket Technology and published numerous research papers.  He is credited for the design and developed the Hypersonic Rocket Launch Vehicle or Hatf Missiles Series during his stay at SUPARCO.

In 1983, Majid was put in-charge of Satellite Development Program of Pakistan. He is widely credited for the indigenous development and launching of BADR-1 and development of Badr-B Earth Observation Satellites. He was keen to develop Pakistan's Space Launch capabilities and met with both former Prime Minister of Pakistan, Nawaz Sharif and Benazir Bhutto to gain their approval for the project. The project however was not sanctioned due to economic constrains.

In 1992, Abdul Majid travelled to Russia, where he was able to sign a deal in 1995 with Russian Federal Space Agency to launch the Pakistani Satellite with a given deadline. According to him, Russians agreed to launch Pakistan's domestically built satellite from their soil. The satellite was completed in 1999 and was transported to Russia in early 2000.

After an initial success in satellite development, Abdul Qadeer Khan met with Majid where they discussed Majid's indigenously designed Low Earth orbit satellite project.  In 1999, Majid, as then-Chairman of Pakistan's Space and Upper Atmosphere Research Commission (SUPARCO) announced that Pakistan would develop its own satellite launching vehicle within a period of about three years. He also met then-Chief executive of Pakistan, Gen. (r). Pervez Musharraf in the army house. He, along with Abdul Qadeer Khan, briefed General Musharraf about the project where Majid received his green signal. However, the SLV Project's status remains unclear.

References

References and Links
 Forum, pakistanidefence.com
 26 June 1999, Dawn
 History, SUPARCO
 Pakistan Satellites Launch Vehicles, defencetalk.com

Pakistani physicists
Pakistani scientists
Pakistani scholars
1941 births
Living people
Alumni of the University of Wales
Space and Upper Atmosphere Research Commission people
Pakistani expatriates in Wales
Administrators of the Space and Upper Atmosphere Research Commission
Aerospace engineers